France competed at the 2020 Summer Paralympics in Tokyo, Japan, from 24 August to 5 September 2021.

Paris will host the 2024 Summer Paralympics, and due to that a French segment featured in the closing ceremony.

Medalists

Archery 

|-
|align=left|Daniel Lelou
|align=left rowspan=2|Men's individual compound
|680
|23
|L 137-141
|colspan=5|Did not advance
|-
|align=left|Éric Pereira
|655
|34
|L 136-138
|colspan=5|Did not advance
|-
|align=left|Guillaume Toucoullet
|align=left|Men's individual recurve
|620
|7
|L 1-4
|colspan=5|Did not advance
|-
|align=left|Julie Chupin
|align=left|Women's individual compound
|682
|8
|
|W 145-138
|L 139-141
|colspan=3|Did not advance
|}

Athletics 

Men's track

Men's field

Women's track

Women's field

Badminton 

Men

Women

Mixed

Boccia

Cycling

Road

Track

Equestrian 

Céline Gerny, Anne-Frédérique Royon, Vladimir Vinchon and Chiara Zenati have all qualified to compete at the Paralympics.

Football 5-a-side 

Team roster

Group A

Seventh place match

Judo

Paracanoeing 

Nelia Barbosa, Rémy Boulle and Eddie Potdevin have qualified to compete at the Paralympics in the paracanoe.

Rowing

France qualified three boats for each of the rowing classes into the Paralympic regatta. All of them qualified after successfully entering the top seven for women's single sculls events and top eight for mixed events at the 2019 World Rowing Championships in Ottensheim, Austria.

Qualification Legend: FA=Final A (medal); FB=Final B (non-medal); R=Repechage

Shooting

France entered eight shooters, all male, into the Paralympic competition.

Swimming 

France have qualified three swimmers to compete in swimming at the 2020 Summer Paralympics via the 2019 World Para Swimming Championships slot allocation method & six swimmer via MQS.
Men

Women

Table tennis

France entered eleven athletes into the table tennis competition at the games. Fabien Lamirault & Thu Kamkasomphou qualified from the 2019 ITTF European Championships which was held in Helsingborg, Sweden and nine other athletes qualified via World Ranking allocation.

Men

Women

Taekwondo

France qualified two athletes to compete at the Paralympics competition. All of them are confirmed to compete after entered top six in world ranking.

Wheelchair rugby

France national wheelchair rugby team qualified for the Games for the games by finishing top two at the 2020 Qualification Tournament in Richmond, Canada.

Team roster
 Team event – 1 team of 12 players

Group stage

Fifth place Match

Wheelchair tennis

France qualified seven players entries for wheelchair tennis. Six of them qualified by the world rankings, while one of them qualified by received the bipartite commission invitation allocation quotas.

See also 
 France at the Paralympics
 France at the 2020 Summer Olympics

References 

Nations at the 2020 Summer Paralympics
2020
2021 in French sport